The St. John the Baptist Cathedral Also Calama Cathedral Is the main Catholic church of the Diocese of San Juan Bautista de Calama, in Chile. It is located in the heart of the city, in front of the plaza 23 de Marzo, and was erected by the Bishop of Antofagasta Monsignor Luis Silva Lezaeta in the year 1906.

In 2000 its roof was changed, being covered with sheets of copper extracted and processed in Chuquicamata, while its tower was lined with the same material of the mine Radomiro Tomic. The Cathedral was consecrated by Monsignor Cristián Contreras Molina the 11 of November 2001.

See also
Roman Catholicism in Chile
St. John the Baptist

References

Roman Catholic cathedrals in Chile
Roman Catholic churches completed in 1906
1906 establishments in Chile
20th-century Roman Catholic church buildings in Chile